John Crockett (circa 1753 – after 1802) was an American frontiersman and soldier, and the father of David "Davy" Crockett.

Early life
Crockett was born about 1753 in either Maryland or Frederick County, Virginia. "Davy" Crockett said in his autobiography that John Crockett was born either in Ireland or during the journey from Ireland to America; but later scholars disagreed, saying this had been John's father, also named David. His ancestors were of Scotch-Irish and possible Huguenot backgrounds. The Crockett/Crocketague name is a Registered Lineage with the Huguenot Society of the Founders of Manakin in the Colony of Virginia (FMCV)  though "Davy" Crockett does not mention it in his autobiography.

In 1775 or 1780, Crockett married Rebecca Hawkins, from Maryland.

Father and family heads west
In 1776, David Crockett and the growing family moved to the Washington District in what is now the northeastern tip of Tennessee, near Rogersville, Tennessee.

Father's demise
In 1777, David Crockett and part of the family were killed in a Chickamauga Cherokee raid, led by Dragging Canoe, at the onset of the Cherokee–American wars. After the attack, the remaining Crocketts sold the property to a new settler in the area, a French Huguenot man, Colonel Thomas Amis.

Military career

During the American War for Independence, Crockett fought along with the Overmountain Men from west of the Appalachians. The Overmountain Men often crossed the mountains to face the British in the war's southern campaign. Crockett fought at the Battle of Kings Mountain in 1780, a major victory for the colonists.

Later life and work

A respected man in the area, Crockett later became a magistrate, a farmer, and an unsuccessful land speculator. The family lived in what is now Greene County, Tennessee, close to the Nolichucky River and near the community of Limestone. It was here, at a location now commemorated as Davy Crockett Birthplace State Park, that David "Davy" Crockett was born in 1786. He was the fifth of the nine Crockett children, and was named for his grandfather. At the time of his birth, the area was part of the autonomous State of Franklin. In 1788, Crockett was justice of the court when a young Andrew Jackson received his law license according to some genealogies.

After a flood destroyed their house, the Crocketts moved to the Morristown, Tennessee area (1792) and built a tavern on a newly constructed stage road between Abingdon, Virginia and Knoxville, Tennessee. The Crockett Tavern Museum now stands on the site, housed in a reconstruction of the tavern.

Young "Davy" helps out

In 1798, when David was 12, Crockett hired him out to Jacob Siler to drive cattle. After young David fulfilled his original obligation to Siler, he returned to his father's home. The family sent Davy to a school that had been established nearby, but he did not like school and quit attending after a few days. The elder Crockett was drunk when he learned his son was avoiding school and he punished Davy severely, leading him to flee and stay away for years. David Crockett returned in 1802 and helped pay off his father's debts.

Death
It's not clear when Crockett died, though some genealogies have his year of death as 1834.

Crockett family tree

References

External links
 Crockett Tavern historical marker

People from Greene County, Tennessee
1754 births
People from the State of Franklin
People of Tennessee in the American Revolution
Presbyterians from Tennessee
19th-century deaths
Davy Crockett
American people of Scotch-Irish descent